Mallammana Pavaada (Meaning: The miracle of Mallamma) is a 1969 Kannada film, directed by Puttanna Kanagal.

The film is based on the novel Ardhaangi written by B. Puttaswamayya. The screenplay was by P. Pullaiah based on his 1955 Telugu movie with similar story titled  Ardhangi, which itself was based on Maddipatla Suri's Telugu translation of the Bengali novel Swayamsidda, written by Manilal Banerjee. Swayamsiddha went on to be made into a 1975 Bengali movie of the same name. Ardhangi was remade in Tamil as Pennin Perumai  and in Hindi twice as Bahurani in 1963 and as Jyoti in 1981. The Kannada novel Mallammana Pavaada also inspired the 1987 Tamil movie Enga Chinna Rasa, which went on to be remade in Telugu as Abbaigaru, in Hindi as Beta, in Kannada as Annayya and in Odia as Santana (1998).

Plot
The female lead of the film, Mallamma is married to a dullard by her parents. While at her in-laws house, Mallamma realises that her husband has been made a dullard by his scheming stepmother, who wants to appropriate the vast property. She educates her husband and frees him from the clutches of his stepmother and makes him realise the value of life.

Cast

Soundtrack

Other versions
The story line has been inspiration for various movies and has had various remakes in Indian film industry.

See also
Rajkumar
B. Saroja Devi
Vajramuni
Cinema of Karnataka

References

1960s Kannada-language films
Films directed by Puttanna Kanagal
Kannada films remade in other languages
Films scored by Vijaya Bhaskar
Kannada literature